Bellas may refer to:
 Bellas, Aïn Defla, a town in northern Algeria
 Bellas Brook, a stream in Wyoming County, Pennsylvania
 Benjamin Bellas (born 1976), American artist
 Bill Bellas (1925–1994), English footballer
 Bruce Bellas (1909–1974), American photographer of the physique of nude males
 Giselle Bellas (active from 2015), Cuban-American singer-songwriter
 Jack Bellas (1895–1977), English footballer
 Pavol Bellás (born 1997), Slovak footballer
 Tomás Bellas (born 1987), Spanish basketball player
 "Bellas" (song), a single by Anthony Santos featuring Romeo Santos

See also
 Bella (disambiguation)
 Bellas Artes (disambiguation)
 Bellas Vistas, an administrative neighborhood (barrio) of Madrid
 Palmas Bellas, a corregimiento in Chagres District, Colón Province, Panama
 The Bella Twins, an American professional wrestling tag team